Aki Heiskanen (born 2 February 1952) is a retired Finnish footballer. During his club career, Heiskanen played for KuPS Kuopio, KPT Kuopio and Elo Kuopio. He made 31 appearances for the Finland national team, scoring 7 goals.

Honours
Finnish Cup: 1968

External links

1952 births
Living people
Finnish footballers
Association football midfielders
Kuopion Palloseura players
Finland international footballers
People from Kuopio
Sportspeople from North Savo